Leopard Island is an island  long, lying  west of the southwest end of Skua Island in the Argentine Islands, Wilhelm Archipelago, Antarctica. It was charted and named in 1935 by the British Graham Land Expedition under John Rymill.

See also 

 List of Antarctic and sub-Antarctic islands

References 

Islands of the Wilhelm Archipelago